The rufous-fronted antthrush (Formicarius rufifrons) is a species of bird in the family Formicariidae. It is found very locally in humid forest in southeastern Peru, northwestern Bolivia (Pando), and far southwestern Brazil (Acre). It is threatened by habitat loss.

References

rufous-fronted antthrush
Birds of the Peruvian Amazon
Birds of the Bolivian Amazon
rufous-fronted antthrush
Taxonomy articles created by Polbot